The Fortifications of Derbent (Darband) are one of the fortified defense lines built by the Persian Sasanian Empire to protect the eastern passage of the Caucasus Mountains (the "Caspian Gates") against the attacks of the nomadic peoples of the Pontic–Caspian steppe. Built in the 6th century during the reign of Persian emperor Khosrow I and maintained by various later Arab, Turkish and Persian regimes, the fortifications comprise three distinct elements: the citadel of Naryn-Kala at Derbent, the twin long walls connecting it with the Caspian Sea in the east, and the "mountain wall" of Dagh-Bary, running from Derbent to the Caucasus foothills in the west. The fortification complex was made a UNESCO World Heritage Site in 2003.

History
Already in Classical Antiquity, the settlement of Derbent and its wider region (the "Caspian Gates") were known for their strategic location between the Caspian Sea and the eastern foothills of the Caucasus Mountains, separating the settled regions south of the Caucasus from the nomadic peoples dominating the Pontic–Caspian steppe to the north. Archaeological evidence points to the establishment of a fortified settlement on the Derbent hill as early as the late 8th century BCE, probably under the impact of Scythian raids. This settlement initially covered only the more protected northeastern side of the hill (some 4–5 hectares), but over the 6th–4th centuries BCE expanded to cover its entire surface ( hectares).

From the 4th century BCE, the settlement began to expand beyond the hill fortress, which became a citadel to an expanding city. In the 1st century BCE, Derbent became incorporated in the kingdom of Caucasian Albania, probably as its northernmost possession. Derbent experienced a period of considerable prosperity in the first three centuries of the Common Era, but the resumption of nomad raids in the 4th century (the Alans and later the Huns) meant that it quickly reverted to its role as a frontier post and a "symbolic boundary between nomadic and agrarian ways of life". In the late 4th century CE, Albania passed under Sasanian influence and control; in the 5th century, it was a Sasanian border fortress and the seat of a march-warden (marzban).

During the reign of Khosrow I the fortress was built. There are also various Middle Persian (Pahlavi) inscriptions on the walls of the fortress and Northern/Southern walls inside the city. After the Arab conquest of Persia various Arabic inscriptions were also made.

The Citadel of Derbent is one of the most popular tourist attractions in the city of Derbent and the Republic of Dagestan.

Documentary film
In 2022 Pejman Akbarzadeh made the documentary film "Derbent: What Persia Left Behind". The film which explores the history and architecture of Derbent fortification was screened at various academic conferences including the German Orientalists Day in Berlin and the biennial of Iranian Studies Association in Salamanca.

References

Sources
 
 
 
 
 
 BBC: Dagestan gunmen kill one at south Russia fortress
 UNESCO: Citadel, Ancient City and Fortress Buildings of Derbent

External links
 Derbent Online

History of Derbent
Derbent
Sasanian defense lines
Walls
Border barriers
World Heritage Sites in Russia
Buildings and structures in Dagestan
Persian-Caucasian architecture
6th century in Iran
Cultural heritage monuments in Derbent
Cultural heritage monuments of federal significance in Dagestan